Antonio M. Delgado was a Puerto Rican politician and elected  Mayor of Ponce, Puerto Rico, for the term starting in 1937. However, he died before taking office.

Mayoral selection
Antonio M. Delgado had been elected mayor of Ponce, Puerto Rico in 1936. However he died before taking office. Given this event, Jose Tormos Diego was selected by the standing political party to replace Mr. Delgado.

See also
List of Puerto Ricans

References

1930s deaths
Mayors of Ponce, Puerto Rico
Year of birth missing
Year of death uncertain
Elected officials who died without taking their seats